Łukasz Opaliński is the name of several Polish nobles:
Łukasz Opaliński (1581–1654), castellan of Poznań
Łukasz Opaliński (1612–1666), Polish poet, writer and political activist